Kapil Arya (born 21 February) is an Indian actor best known for his role of sub inspector Aditya in Life OK's Supercops vs supervillains and Mahadev in Jag Janani Maa Vaishno Devi - Kahani Mata Rani Ki.

Personal life 
Kapil is married to actor Gurpreet Bedi. The couple tied the knot in Karjat on 22nd December.

Career 
Kapil started his television career with SuperCops vs Supervillains in 2012 playing the role of sub-inspector Aditya. The TV show aired on Life OK and is now available to see on Hotstar. This was followed by his role in Zee TV's Doli Armaano Ki where he played the role of Karan.

In 2014, Kapil played the character 'Ghatotkach' in Life OK's Laut Aao Trisha followed by his character Siddhant in Rishton Ka Saudagar – Baazigar in 2016.

In 2017, Kapil played Achutya in Sony SAB's Tenali Rama (TV series), an Indian Hindi-language historical comedy drama based on the life of the legendary Telugu poet Tenali Ramakrishna and Chandrasen in Sony Television's Peshwa Bajirao (TV series) along with StarPlus's Mere Angne Mein.

Kapils highlight in 2019-2020 was his character Mahadev played in Jag Janani Maa Vaishno Devi - Kahani Mata Rani Ki

He has appeared in multiple commercials and TV shows.

Filmography

Television shows

Commercial

References

External links 
 
 Kapil Arya seen in Muthoot Fincorp commercial
 Kapil arya playing karan in Doli Armaano Ki
 Kapil Arya & Gurpreet Bedi Wedding Story

21st-century Indian actors
Indian television actors
Indian male soap opera actors
Male actors in Hindi television
Living people
Year of birth missing (living people)